The Sibelius Academy is part of the University of the Arts Helsinki and a university-level music school which operates in Helsinki and Kuopio, Finland. It also has an adult education centre in Järvenpää and a training centre in Seinäjoki. The Academy is the only music university in Finland. It is among the biggest European music universities with roughly 1,400 enrolled students.

The Sibelius Academy is the organizer of the International Maj Lind Piano Competition and one of the organizers of the International Jean Sibelius Violin Competition held every five years in Helsinki.

History
In 2013, the academy merged with two formerly independent universities, Helsinki Theatre Academy and Academy of Fine Arts, Helsinki, to form the University of the Arts Helsinki.

Degrees
The primary degree at the Sibelius Academy is the Master of Music (MMus) degree. The school also offers postgraduate degrees with artistic and research options. The postgraduate degrees are the Licentiate of Arts in Music Lic.A. (Mus.) and the doctoral degree of Doctor of Arts in Music D.A. (Mus.)

Degree programmes
The Academy offers the following degree programmes:
Degree Programme in Church Music
Degree Programme in Composition and Music Theory
Degree Programme in Folk Music
Degree Programme in Jazz Music
Degree Programme in Orchestral and Choral Conducting
Degree Programme in Music Education
Degree Programme in Music Technology
Degree Programme in Music Performance
Degree Programme in Vocal Music
Degree Programme in Arts Management

Notable students and faculty (past and present)

Composers
Greta Dahlström, music teacher and composer
Kalevi Aho
Erik Bergman
Paavo Heininen, former professor of composition 
Tuomas Kantelinen
Pekka Kostiainen, composer and choral conductor
Magnus Lindberg
Jaakko Mäntyjärvi
Erkki Melartin, student/composer/professor/Director Helsinki Conservatory
Veli-Matti Puumala, professor of composition
Einojuhani Rautavaara
Kaija Saariaho
Aulis Sallinen
Jean Sibelius

Conductors
Leo Funtek (1885–1965), violinist, conductor, arranger and music professor
Paavo Berglund, conductor
Pietari Inkinen, violinist, and conductor
Sasha Mäkilä, assistant conductor of The Cleveland Orchestra
Eva Ollikainen, conductor of the Iceland Symphony Orchestra
Sakari Oramo, conductor of the BBC Symphony Orchestra
Jorma Panula, conductor, composer and teacher
Atso Almila, conductor, composer and teacher
Esa-Pekka Salonen, conductor of the Philharmonia Orchestra, former conductor of the LA Philharmonic, composer
Jukka-Pekka Saraste, former conductor of the Toronto Symphony Orchestra
David Searle, orchestral conductor of The Catholic University of America Symphony Orchestra
Leif Segerstam, conductor of the Turku Philharmonic Orchestra
Ulf Söderblom, Principal Conductor of the Finnish National Opera (1973–1993), taught at the Sibelius Academy and conducted its orchestras from 1965 to 1968 
Heidi Sundblad-Halme, founder and conductor of the Helsinki Women’s Orchestra; composer 
Okko Kamu, conductor of the Lahti Symphony Orchestra
Osmo Vänskä, music director of the Minnesota Orchestra
Mikko Franck, conductor of the Orchestre philharmonique de Radio France
Susanna Mälkki, conductor of the Helsinki Philharmonic Orchestra
Hannu Lintu, conductor of the Finnish Radio Symphony Orchestra
Klaus Mäkelä, conductor of the Orchestre de Paris
Dima Slobodeniouk, conductor of the Orquesta Sinfonica de Galicia
Santtu-Matias Rouvali, conductor of the Tampere Philharmonic Orchestra, the Gothenburg Symphony Orchestra, and the Philharmonia Orchestra
Dalia Stasevska, conductor of the Lahti Symphony Orchestra

Instrumentalists
Astrid Riska, organist
Juhani Aaltonen, Finnish jazz saxophonist and flautist
Linda Brava, violinist
France Ellegaard (1913–1999), pianist and faculty member
Gerard Le Feuvre, cellist and founder of the Kings Chamber Orchestra
Simon Ghraichy (1985), pianist
Tuija Hakkila (1959), pianist
Anja Ignatius (1911–1995), violinist and professor
Kalevi Kiviniemi, organist
Kari Kriikku, clarinetist
Matias Kupiainen, lead guitarist of the band Stratovarius
Pekka Kuusisto, violinist
Risto Lauriala, pianist
Max Lilja, cellist in the band Hevein and founding member of Apocalyptica
Hui-Ying Liu-Tawaststjerna, pianist
Paavo Lötjönen, cellist in the band Apocalyptica
Antero Manninen, former cellist in the band Apocalyptica and cellist in the Helsinki Philharmonic Orchestra
Olli Mustonen, pianist and composer
Arto Noras, cellist, student of Paul Tortelier
Mikko Paananen, known as Mige, bassist of the band HIM
Martti Pokela, founder of the folk music department and former professor of the kantele
Aku Raski aka Huoratron, electro house and chiptune musician
Martti Rousi, cello teacher
Kaija Saarikettu, Professor of solo strings and chamber music
Antti Siirala, winner of the Dublin, Leeds, and Beethoven international piano competitions
Agnes Tschetschulin, violinist, composer, one of the first four graduates
Eicca Toppinen, cellist in the band Apocalyptica
Perttu Kivilaakso, cellist in the band Apocalyptica, former Helsinki Philharmonic Orchestra

Vocalists
Anneli Aarika-Szrok, contralto
Kim Borg, bass
Monica Groop, mezzo-soprano
Tommi Hakala, baritone, winner of the 2003 Cardiff Singer of the World Competition
Jorma Hynninen, baritone
Soile Isokoski, soprano
Topi Lehtipuu, tenor
Peter Lindroos, tenor (was both a student and teacher at the academy) 
Karita Mattila, soprano, winner of the 1983 Cardiff Singer of the World Competition
Jyrki Niskanen, tenor
Arja Saijonmaa, singer
Petteri Salomaa, bass-baritone
Tuuli Takala, soprano
Tarja Turunen, soprano, former singer of the symphonic metal band Nightwish
Soila Sariola, singer of the double platinum awarded and multiple gold winning vocal ensemble Rajaton
Matti Salminen, bass
Paula Vesala, singer of PMMP
Martti Wallén, opera singer

Junior Academy
Junior Academy is for highly skilled young musicians to study with top level professionals before entering a university.

References

External links

Sibelius Academy
Sibelius Academy official Facebook page
Effects of the Bologna Declaration on Professional Music Training in Europe
European Association of Conservatoires (AEC)

 
Culture in Helsinki
Education in Helsinki
Music schools in Finland
Universities and colleges in Finland
Educational institutions established in 1882
1882 establishments in Finland
Töölö
Things named after Jean Sibelius